Christian Merlin (born 2 March 1964) is a French contemporary music critic and musicologist.

Biography 
Christian Merlin, who holds an agrégation in German and a doctorate in literature, is a musicologist and a lecturer at the Charles de Gaulle University – Lille III. A music critic at Le Figaro and the magazine Diapason, he contributes to programmes on France Musique such as Le Casque et l'enclume and Classic Club. He is also the author or editor of several issues of L'Avant-Scène Opéra, as well as of a book devoted to the symphony orchestra, documented by long years of acquaintance with instrumentalists and conductors.

Publications 
2002: Richard Wagner, mode d'emploi, éd. L'Avant-Scène Opéra,.
2007: Richard Strauss, mode d'emploi, éd. L'Avant-Scène Opéra, 191 pages .
2007: Opéra et mise en scène, (dir.) éd. L'Avant-Scène Opéra, 120 pages,.
2012: Au cœur de l'orchestre, Paris, Fayard, 520 pages, 
2013: Les grands chefs d'orchestre du XXe siècle, Paris, Éditions , 424 pages, 
2017: Le Philharmonique de Vienne, Paris, Éditions Buchet/Chastel, 690 pages,

References

External links 
 Christian Merlin : Il est injuste qu’on parle si peu des musiciens d’orchestre on La Croix (7 June 2012)
 Christian Merlin on France Inter
 Christian Merlin's articles on Le Figaro
 Christian Merlin, journaliste au Figaro
  Chrfistian Merlin on France Musique
 La chronique musique de Christian Merlin on France Musique

Classical music critics
20th-century French journalists
21st-century French journalists
21st-century French musicologists
French music educators
1964 births
Living people
Le Figaro people